Thompson Township is one of the sixteen townships of Geauga County, Ohio, United States. As of the 2020 census the population was 2,144.

Geography
Located in the northeastern corner of the county, it borders the following townships:
 Madison Township, Lake County – north
 Harpersfield Township, Ashtabula County – northeast corner
 Trumbull Township, Ashtabula County – east
 Hartsgrove Township, Ashtabula County – southeast corner
 Montville Township – south
 Hambden Township – southwest corner
 LeRoy Township, Lake County – west

No municipalities are located in Thompson Township. The township contains the unincorporated community of Thompson.

Thompson Township is the location of the Thompson Ledges landform.

Name and history
Statewide, other Thompson Townships are located in Delaware and Seneca counties.

Television 
WVIZ's transmitter is located in the southern part of the township; it has been standing since 1991.

Government
The township is governed by a three-member board of trustees, who are elected in November of odd-numbered years to a four-year term beginning on the following January 1. Two are elected in the year after the presidential election and one is elected in the year before it. There is also an elected township fiscal officer, who serves a four-year term beginning on April 1 of the year after the election, which is held in November of the year before the presidential election. Vacancies in the fiscal officership or on the board of trustees are filled by the remaining trustees.

Communication
Thompson Township is the site of WKSV 89.1 FM, a repeater transmitter for the WKSU public radio station based in Kent.

Notable people
Charles Martin Hall inventor of the modern process of aluminum production and founder of Alcoa.

References

Further reading
 General History of Geauga County, with Sketches of some of the Pioneers and Prominent Men, published in 1880 by the Historical Society of Geauga County

External links
 Township website
 County website

Townships in Geauga County, Ohio
1801 establishments in the Northwest Territory
Populated places established in 1801
Townships in Ohio